Estremera is a municipality of the autonomous community of Madrid in central Spain. It belongs to the comarca of Las Vegas.  The historic Church of Nuestra Señora de los Remedios stands in the town. The town is the site of Estremera Prison.

References

 
Municipalities in the Community of Madrid